Ozeljan is a village in the lower Vipava Valley in western Slovenia. It is part of the Municipality of Nova Gorica in the Gorizia region of the Slovenian Littoral.

The core of the village was built around the church dedicated to Saint James and the Coronnini mansion. The church belongs to the Parish of Šempas.

History
The settlement was first mentioned in the 12th century (in the year 1176). The village was part of the Parish of Šempas. In the former times the locals were mainly farmers.

References

External links

Ozeljan on Geopedia

Populated places in the City Municipality of Nova Gorica